Boazi (Bwadji), also known as Kuni after one of its dialects, is a Papuan language spoken in the Western Province of Papua New Guinea by the Bwadji people in the vicinity of Lake Murray and is written using the Latin script. Some recordings of songs and stories have been made in this language.

Further reading
Drabbe, Petrus. 1954. Talen en dialecten van zuid-west Nieuw-Guinea [Languages and Dialects of Southwest New Guinea]. Posieux/Fribourg: Instituut Anthropos.
Edwards-Fumey, Deborah. 2006. The verb subject prefix in Kuni. MA thesis: Universität Bern.

References

Boazi languages
Languages of Western Province (Papua New Guinea)